Sonia Ibrahim is an actress, television presenter and model  of Lebanese, Liberian and Ghanaian descent and is the younger sister of actress Juliet Ibrahim.

Career
In December 2013, Ibrahim was elected as the new host of Phamous tv program broadcast by television network Viasat 1 and she has modeled for several big names. Sonia was nominated for her performance in a leading role in the award-winning Gollywood film Number One Fan starring her actress sister Juliet Ibrahim at the 2013 Ghana Movie Awards

Awards 
 Best Supporting Actress-NAFCA 
 Best Supporting Actress-City People Magazine
 Actress Of The Year Africa-NEA
 Actress of the Year-Zenith University

References

External links
  The Number One Fan: Sonia Ibrahim
  Shattered Romance: Sonia Ibrahim
 

1980s births
Living people
Ghanaian television presenters
Ghanaian women television presenters